Minimal Essential Medium (MEM) is a synthetic cell culture medium developed by Harry Eagle first published in 1959 in Science that can be used to maintain cells in tissue culture. It is based on 6 salts and glucose described in Earle's salts in 1934: (calcium chloride, potassium chloride, magnesium sulfate, sodium chloride, sodium phosphate and sodium bicarbonate),  supplemented with 13 essential amino acids,  and 8 vitamins: thiamine (vitamin B1), riboflavin (vitamin B2), nicotinamide (vitamin B3), pantothenic acid (vitamin B5), pyrodoxine (vitamin B6), folic acid (vitamin B9), choline, and myo-inositol (originally known as vitamin B8).

Many variations of this medium have been developed, mostly adding additional vitamins, amino acids, and/or other nutrients.

Eagle developed his earlier "Basal Medium Eagle" (BME) in 1955–1957 on mouse L cells and human HeLa cells, with 13 essential amino acids and 9 vitamins added. BME contains biotin (vitamin B7), which Eagle later found to be superfluous. His 1959 "Minimal Essential Medium" doubles the amount of many amino acids to "conform more closely to the protein composition of cultured human cells. This permits the cultures to be kept for somewhat longer periods without refeeding".

DMEM (Dulbecco's Modified Eagle's Medium) was originally suggested as Eagle's medium with a 'Fourfold concentration of amino acids and vitamins' by Renato Dulbecco and G. Freeman published in 1959. The commercial versions of this medium have additional modifications, see an example in the table below.

α-MEM (Minimum Essential Medium Eagle - alpha modification) is a medium based on MEM published in 1971 by Clifford P. Stanners and colleagues. It contains more non-essential amino acids, sodium pyruvate, and vitamins (ascorbic acid (vitamin C), biotin, and cyanocobalamin) compared with MEM. It can also come with lipoic acid and nucleosides.

Glasgow's MEM (Glasgow Minimal Essential Medium) is yet another modification, prepared by lan MacPherson and Michael Stoker.

Composition 

One liter of each medium contains (in milligrams):

See also 
 RPMI 1640 (Roswell Park Memorial Institute medium), for lymph cells

References 

Cell culture media